Clarence Merle "Nibs" Price (April 26, 1889 – January 13, 1968) was a basketball and American football coach.  After coaching at San Diego High School, he served as the head football coach at the University of California, Berkeley from 1926 to 1930, compiling the a record of 27–17–3, and the head men's basketball coach at Berkeley from 1924 to 1954, tallying a mark of 453–294. He led the 1946 basketball team to the Final Four. Succeeding Andy Smith as Cal's football coach, Price guided the Golden Bears to the 1929 Rose Bowl, a game infamous for Roy Riegels's wrong-way run. His 1926–27 basketball team finished the season with a 17–0 record and was retroactively named the national champion by the Premo-Porretta Power Poll. Price died on January 13, 1968, at the age of 77 in Oakland, California.

Head coaching record

Football

Basketball

See also
 List of NCAA Division I Men's Final Four appearances by coach

References

1889 births
1968 deaths
American men's basketball coaches
California Golden Bears baseball players
California Golden Bears football coaches
California Golden Bears men's basketball coaches
High school football coaches in California
San Diego High School alumni